Omara or OMARA may refer to:

People
Omara Portuondo, Cuban female singer
Omara Atubo, Ugandan politician
Omara Durand, Cuban female paralympic
Omara Khan Massoudi, Afghan museum director
Betty Boniphace Omara, Tanzanian beauty pageant
Bombino (musician), born Omara Moctar, Niger guitarist
O'Mara, surname

Settlements
Amir ol Omara, Pakistan
Omaraj, Albania

Organizations
Haouch El-Omara, defunct Lebanese basketball team
OMARA, Office of the Migration Agents Registration Authority (Australia)